Ramulispora sorghicola is a plant pathogen infecting sorghum.

References

External links 
 Index Fungorum
 USDA ARS Fungal Database

Fungal plant pathogens and diseases
Sorghum diseases
Hyaloscyphaceae